CIEL UK (Centre International d'Etudes Liturgiques - UK) is the British branch of CIEL, an international Roman Catholic society that is dedicated to scholarly analysis and pastoral familiarity of the traditional liturgy of the Roman Catholic Church (commonly referred to as the Tridentine Mass) within the English-speaking world, in collaboration with CIEL.

Each year CIEL UK organises an annual High Mass and conference in London and publishes English translations of the proceedings of the international CIEL Colloquia.

2008 Mass and Conference
The 2008 Mass and Conference took place on Saturday 31 May. High Mass was offered by Fr Ignatius Harrison in the London Oratory church at 11:00am, followed by the Conference at 2.30pm in St Wilfid's Hall. The theme of this year's conference was "The Liturgical Reforms of Benedict XVI" and a paper was given by distinguished liturgical scholar and deacon Rev Dr Alcuin Reid.

2007 Mass and Conference

The 2007 Annual Mass and conference took place at the London Oratory on Saturday 19 May. The Mass was celebrated by the Very Rev. Fr. Ignatius Harrison, Cong. Orat., Provost of the London Oratory. The Mass setting was Giovanni Pierluigi da Palestrina's Missa Brevis, sung by the Choir of the London Oratory and directed by Patrick Russill. The theme of the conference given later that day was 'The liturgical devotions to Our Lady'. The speakers were Msgr. Michael Schmitz from the Institute of Christ the King and Rev. Fr. Jerome Bertram, Cong. Orat. from the Oxford Oratory.

See also
 CIEL France
 Indult Catholic
 Una Voce
 London Oratory
 Latin Mass Society of England and Wales
 Institute of Christ the King
 FSSP

References

External links
 London Oratory website
 The Roman Breviary online
 Latin Mass Society's website
 The Institute of Christ the King
 The Priestly Fraternity of St. Peter in the UK
 Traditional Latin Mass - CatholicLatinMass.org
 The Genius of the Roman Rite - Acts of the 11th Colloquium

Ecclesia Dei
Catholic Church in England and Wales